A 999-year lease, under historic common law, is an essentially permanent lease of property. The lease locations are mainly in Britain, its former colonies, and the Commonwealth.

A former colony, the Republic of Mauritius (The Raphael Fishing Company Ltd v. The State of Mauritius & Anor (Mauritius) [2008] UKPC 43 (30 July 2008)) established legal precedent on 30 July 2008 in respect of a 1901 'permanent lease' on the Thirteen Islands of St. Brandon (Cargados Carajos) which were adjudged as being a permanent grant by the Privy Council of the United Kingdom.

Examples of land subject to a 999-year lease agreement or Permanent Grant

See also
 99-year lease
 999-year leases in Hong Kong
 Permanent Grant

References

Real property law
Common law
Contract law
Outer Islands of Mauritius
Reefs of the Indian Ocean
Atolls of the Indian Ocean
Privy Council of the United Kingdom